Terna may refer to:

Places
 Terňa, a village in the Prešov Region of Slovakia
 Terna River, Latur District, Maharashtra, India

Religion
 A terna is a list of three candidates for the office of bishop used in the episcopal selection process of the Roman Catholic Church

People
 Fredrick Terna (1923-2022), Austrian-born American artist

Companies
 Terna - Rete Elettrica Nazionale, the Italian electricity transmission operator
 GEK Terna, a Greek construction industry conglomerate
 Terna Energy, electric utilities branch of the Greek conglomerate GEK Terna